AXGIO (stylized as /.AXGIO) is an online brand based on the Amazon Marketplace. It was founded  in 2013.

The company develops, manufactures and markets earphones and other consumer electronics.

Company history 
In 2014, AXGIO opened an official store named AXGIO US on :Amazon.com, marketing :mobile phone and mobile phone accessories. It has launched three cellphone models: the Wing W2, Neon N1, and Neon N2Q. AXGIO's products were shipped to Amazon's US-based warehouse so that customer could receive their packages within one week.

The company's first :Bluetooth earphones, the Mini Pro, were launched in early 2015.

AXGIO's most recent wireless Bluetooth earphones are the AXGIO AH-T1 and AXGIO Atom, which were released in 2016.

Products 
 Chargers – USB wall chargers and car chargers
 Mini Pro- Bluetooth earphones
 Zest - Bluetooth earphones
 Vigour 2 - Bluetooth earphones
 Spirit - Bluetooth earphones
 Sprint - Bluetooth earphones
 VR Headset – Phone peripheral
 Backfit - Bluetooth earphones
 AH-T1 - Bluetooth earphones
 Atom - Bluetooth earphones

Reception 
The AXGIO AH-T1 has been generally well-received, both on Amazon and third party publishers, such as Lifehacker and Forbes.

References

External links
 "Official AXGIO Website"
 Shep McAllister. "Finally, True Wireless Headphones For $40". lifehacker
 Ben Sin. "These True Wireless Earbuds Won't Fall Out Of Your Ear". :forbes
 "Axgio US rated 5/5 based on 1,738 Amazon customers reviews …..".  marketplacepulse
 "Amazing bluetooth Range, no wire is a thing ! "       head-fi.org
 Maren Estrada. "These truly wireless $50 earbuds look so much better than Apple’s nonexistent AirPods". bgr
 "Axgio Deals".  KinjaDeals
 "How do I feel about Axgio Sprint?".  xda-developers
 Ben Sin.  "Why Wait For The AirPod? These Three Truly Wireless Earbuds Work Great And Are Available Now".

Consumer electronics retailers
Electronics companies of China